Krystyna Viktorivna Bardash (born 28 August 1990), better known as Luna, is a Ukrainian indie pop singer-songwriter, model and, formerly, photographer.

Biography 
She was born on August 28, 1990 in the city of Karl-Marx-Stadt, East Germany in the family of the Group of Soviet Forces in Germany serviceman. A few years later the family returned to Ukraine. Her music was praised by critics for the combination of electronic music with a melancholy mood, and also for references to '90s pop culture.

Discography

Albums
 2016 – "Маг-ни-ты" (Magnets)
 2017 – "Остров свободы" (Freedom Island)
 2018 – "Заколдованные сны" (Enchanted Dreams)
 2019 – "Транс" (Trance)

EPs
 2016 – "Грустный дэнс" (Sad dance)
 2020 – "Fata Morgana"

Singles

 2015 – "Луна" (Moon)
 2015 – "Осень" (Autumn)
 2015 – "Алиса" (Alice)
 2015 – "Лютики" (Buttercups)
 2015 – "Мальчик, ты снег" (Boy, you're snow)
 2016 – "Он с тобою не..." (With you he is not...)
 2016 – "Бутылочка" (Little bottle)
 2016 – "Самолёты" (Planes)
 2016 – "Грустный дэнс" (Sad dance)
 2016 – "Нож" (Knife)
 2016 – "За край" (Over the edge)
 2017 – "Пули" (Bullets)
 2017 – "Огонёк" (Sparkle)
 2017 – "Друг" (Friend)
 2017 – "Free Love"
 2018 – "Поцелуи" (Kisses)
 2018 – "Jukebox"
 2018 – "Спящая красавица" (Sleeping beauty)

 2019 – "Тропик козерога" (Tropic of the Capricorn)
 2019 – "Сижки" (Cigs)
 2019 – "Кровавый колодец" (Bloody well)
 2019 – "Сила стона" (Moan power)
 2019 – "Дельфины" (Dolphins)
 2019 – "Лунные гипнозы" (Lunar hypnosis)
 2019 – "Сиреневый рай" (Lilac paradise)
 2019 – "Золотые лепестки" (Golden petals)
 2020 – "Fata Morgana" 
 2020 – "Летние бульвары" (Summer boulevards)
 2020 – "Лебединая" (Swan song)
 2021 – "Жанна Дарк" (Joan of Arc)
 2021 – "Пташка" (Birdy)
 2021 – "Ухажёр" (Admirer)
 2022 – "Виграй" (Gain)
 2022 – "Ще раз" (Once again)
 2022 – "Пелікан" (Pelican)
 2022 – "Сльози ллють дівчата" (The girls shed tears)

References

External links 
 Official Website (Archived)

1990 births
Living people
Musicians from Dresden
21st-century Ukrainian women singers
Ukrainian pop singers
Ukrainian singer-songwriters
Russian-language singers